"Borrowed Time" is a song from John Lennon and Yoko Ono's last album, Milk and Honey. While the single failed to chart in the United States, it charted at number 32 in the UK Singles Chart. The B-side features Ono's song "Your Hands" from the same album.

Composition
The song was inspired during Lennon's 1980 sailing holiday  from Newport, Rhode Island to Bermuda. During the journey, Lennon's yacht encountered a prolonged and severe storm, resulting in most of the crew eventually succumbing to profound fatigue and seasickness. Lennon (free of seasickness) was eventually forced to take the yacht's wheel alone for many hours. Lennon found this terrifying but invigorating, with the effect of both renewing his confidence and making him contemplate the fragility of life (Lennon claimed his recovery from heroin addiction some years earlier had rendered him immune to seasickness). Once he arrived in Bermuda, Lennon heard the line 'living on borrowed time' from Bunny Wailer's "Hallelujah Time" and was inspired by his recent experience to write the lyrics around that theme. Wailer was also the inspiration for the reggae feel of the music. Lennon commented that living on borrowed time was exactly what he was doing but then said, "come to think of it, it's what we're all doing, even though most of us don't like to face it." (Seaman, 1991, p159).

Recording
A demo of the song with acoustic guitar and double-tracked vocals was recorded in Bermuda on 22 June 1980 and was released on the John Lennon Anthology in 1998.
 
An attempt was made to formally record the song during the Double Fantasy sessions on 6 August 1980. It was the second song attempted during the sessions, with Lennon telling the band to think of the Isley Brothers' "Twist and Shout" and "Spanish Twist". As he was somewhat frustrated that the band could not quite catch the reggae feel, Lennon decided to set the song aside.  A horn overdub was planned, but never recorded. The song was later released incomplete and posthumously on Milk and Honey.

Reception
Cash Box said that "the sparse musical backing and the cut’s reggae/calypso setting make 'Borrowed Time' a true delight."

Personnel
John Lennon – vocals, rhythm guitar
Earl Slick, Hugh McCracken – guitar
Tony Levin – bass guitar
George Small – keyboards
Andy Newmark – drums
Arthur Jenkins – percussion

Covers
The song was covered by O.A.R. for Instant Karma: The Amnesty International Campaign to Save Darfur, Amnesty International's campaign to alleviate the crisis in Darfur.

References

John Lennon songs
Songs written by John Lennon
1984 singles
Songs released posthumously
Song recordings produced by John Lennon
Song recordings produced by Yoko Ono
Polydor Records singles
1984 songs